VPC can stand for
 Ventricular premature contraction, a type of abnormal heartbeat
 Volts Per Cell, the voltage needed to charge a battery
 Violence Policy Center, US organization advocating firearms control
 Vapour Phase Chromatography
 Virtual private cloud, within a public cloud computing network
 Virtual PortChannel - Cisco MC-LAG technology
 The Voter Participation Center

VPC can also refer to
 Cartersville Airport, IATA code
 VP-C, Cayman Islands aircraft registration prefix